Joey McFarland (born April 30, 1972) is an American film producer and the founder of McFarland Entertainment, a content development and production company for both film and television. He was previously vice chairman of Red Granite Pictures.

Life and career

McFarland was born in Louisville, Kentucky. He attended DeSales High School and the University of Louisville.

In 2010, with producing partner Riza Aziz, McFarland co-founded Red Granite Pictures. In 2011, Variety named McFarland to their list of Top 10 Producers to Watch.

McFarland's first production under the Red Granite banner was the romantic comedy, Friends with Kids. Written and directed by Jennifer Westfeldt, Friends with Kids also starred Jon Hamm, Adam Scott, Kristen Wiig, Maya Rudolph, and Chris O'Dowd. In 2012, McFarland went on to executive produce the dramatic thriller, Out of the Furnace, starring Christian Bale, Casey Affleck, Zoe Saldana, and Forest Whitaker, and directed by Scott Cooper.

Next McFarland produced The Wolf of Wall Street. The Wolf of Wall Street is based upon Jordan Belfort's best-selling novel of the same name. The book was adapted into a screenplay by Terence Winter. The film stars Leonardo DiCaprio, Jonah Hill, Matthew Mcconaughey, and Margot Robbie, and was directed by Martin Scorsese. Released on December 25, 2013 by Paramount Pictures, The Wolf of Wall Street was a commercial hit and garnered critical acclaim including a Golden Globe win for Best Actor in a Motion Picture Comedy for star Leonardo DiCaprio and five Academy Award nominations including Best Actor, Best Director and Best Picture for which McFarland received a nomination.

In 2013, McFarland completed production on Horns, a supernatural thriller starring Daniel Radcliffe, Juno Temple and directed by Alexandre Aja. The film is based on the best-selling novel by Joe Hill and was released October 31, 2014 by Dimension-RADiUS.

McFarland was also a producer on the sequel Dumb and Dumber To, directed by Pete and Bobby Farrelly. The film featured Jim Carrey and Jeff Daniels again playing Lloyd Christmas and Harry Dunne, respectively, and was released on November 14, 2014 by Universal Pictures. It opened number one at the box office to generally negative reviews.

McFarland was executive producer on the film [[Daddy's Home (film)|Daddy's Home]] directed by Sean Anders and John Morris. Shot in New Orleans, it re-teamed Will Ferrell and Mark Wahlberg for the first time since 2010. Red Granite Pictures co-produced and co-financed the film with Paramount Pictures, in association with Gary Sanchez Productions. Paramount Pictures was also the worldwide distribution partner. The film was released on December 25, 2015.

McFarland produced Papillon, a remake of the 1973 film of the same name based on the best-selling autobiography by the French convict Henri Charrière. The film starred Charlie Hunnam as Henri Charrière ("Papillon"), and Rami Malek as Louis Dega. It premiered in September 2017 at the 2017 Toronto International Film Festival. Papillon was released August 24, 2018.

In 2018, he formed the independent production company for both television and film called McFarland Entertainment.

Malaysian 1MDB scandal

In 2019, McFarland agreed to voluntarily surrender to the US government a series of luxury goods allegedly bought with money that could be traced back to the Malaysian 1MDB state fund.

 Controversy 
In November 2022, at the Los Angeles premiere for Emancipation, McFarland gave a red carpet interview revealing an original 1863 photograph from his pocket of Gordon, who the film is based on. McFarland received a variety of criticisms for this action. McFarlad was a producer of the film.

FilmographyHe was producer for all films unless otherwise noted.''

Film

Awards and nominations

References

External links
 
 Friends With Kids a first of many for Louisville-born producer

1972 births
Living people
21st-century American businesspeople
American film producers
Businesspeople from Louisville, Kentucky
Film producers from Kentucky
University of Louisville alumni